Božena is a feminine given name. Notable people with the name include:

 Božena (Křesinová), Bohemian duchess
 Božena Angelova, Slovenian violinist
 Božena Dobešová, Czech gymnast
 Božena Komárková, Czech philosopher
 Božena Laglerová, Czech aviator
 Božena Němcová, Czech writer
 Božena Slančíková-Timrava, Slovak writer
 Božena Srncová, Czech gymnast

See also
 Bożena

External links
 http://www.behindthename.com/name/boz18ena

Czech feminine given names
Slovene feminine given names
Croatian feminine given names